There are 27 named tunnels in Montana. A tunnel is an underground passageway, completely enclosed except for openings for egress, commonly at each end.  Tunnel may be for foot or vehicular road traffic, for rail traffic, or for a canal.

 (four) Chicago, Milwaukee, St. Paul and Pacific Railroad (Milwaukee Road) tunnels, abandoned rail tunnels, Great Falls Line, from east to west:
 Lacey Tunnel Number 3, abandoned rail tunnel, c. 1913, Milwaukee Road, Chouteau County, Montana, el. 
 Amphitheater Tunnel Number 4, abandoned rail tunnel, 1913, Milwaukee Road, Chouteau County, Montana, el. 
 Belt Creek Tunnel Number 5, abandoned rail tunnel, 1913, Milwaukee Road, Chouteau County, Montana, el. 
 Red Coulee Tunnel Number 6, abandoned rail tunnel, 1914, Milwaukee Road, Cascade County, Montana, el. 
 Beavertail Tunnel, rail tunnel, near I-90 interchange 130 in Missoula County, Montana, el. 
 Bighorn Tunnel, abandoned rail tunnel, 1882-1952, near I-94 interchange 49 in Yellowstone County, Montana, el. 
 (two) Bozeman Tunnels, rail tunnels, under I-90 at Bozeman Pass in Gallatin County, Montana, el. 
abandoned rail tunnel, 1884-c. 1945, Northern Pacific Railway
active rail tunnel, 1945, Montana Rail Link (formerly Northern Pacific Railway)
 Flathead Tunnel, rail tunnel, 1970, BNSF Railway (formerly Burlington Northern Railroad and Great Northern Railway) in Lincoln County northwest of Kalispell
 Helena Valley Canal Tunnel, water tunnel, east of Helena in Lewis and Clark County, Montana, el. 
 John Tunnel, rail tunnel, in Sanders County, Montana northwest of Missoula, el. 
 Monitor Tunnel, abandoned rail tunnel, in Butte, Silver Bow County, Montana, el. 
 Mullan Tunnel, rail tunnel, c. 1883, Montana Rail Link (formerly Northern Pacific Railway), under the Continental Divide at Mullan Pass, northwest of Helena between Lewis and Clark County, Montana and Powell County, Montana, el. 
 (two) Nimrod Tunnels, rail tunnels, adjacent to I-90 in Granite County, Montana southeast of Missoula, el. 
abandoned rail tunnel, in use 1908-1980, Chicago, Milwaukee, St. Paul & Pacific Railroad Tunnel Number 15
active rail tunnel, 1882, BNSF Railway (formerly Montana Rail Link and Northern Pacific Railway)
 Painted Robe Tunnel, rail tunnel, in Golden Valley County, Montana northwest of Billings, el. 
 Ptarmigan Tunnel, pedestrian tunnel, 1930, in Glacier National Park, Glacier County, Montana, el. 
 St. Paul Pass Tunnel/Taft Tunnel, abandoned rail tunnel, in use 1908-1980, Chicago, Milwaukee, St. Paul & Pacific Railroad Tunnel Number 20, between Mineral County, Montana and Shoshone County, Idaho, now part of Milwaukee Road Rail Trail, el. 
 Schurchs Tunnel, Powell County, Montana, el. 
 Toston Canal Tunnel, water tunnel, Broadwater County, Montana, between Helena and Bozeman, el. 
 (two) rail tunnels, on the other side of the Missouri River from I-15, from east to west:
 Tunnel Number 1, rail tunnel, on the other side of the Missouri River from interchange 244 on I-15 in Cascade County, Montana, el. 
 Tunnel Number 3, rail tunnel, on the other side of the Missouri River from Mile Marker 237 on I-15 in Lewis and Clark County, Montana, el. 
 Tunnel Number 1, former rail tunnel, possibly either bypassed or daylighted, just north of interchange 324 on I-90 in Park County, Montana, el. 
 (two) adjacent rail tunnels along US 2 adjacent to Glacier National Park in Flathead County, Montana, from south to north:
 Tunnel Number 2, rail tunnel, el. 
 Tunnel Number 3, rail tunnel, el. 
 Two Leggins Canal Tunnel, water tunnel, in Big Horn County, Montana north of Hardin, el. 
 Vista Tunnel, former rail tunnel, either bypassed or daylighted, northwest of Whitefish in Flathead County, Montana, el. 
 Wayne Tunnel, rail tunnel, 1911, BNSF Railway (formerly Great Northern Railway), southeast of Great Falls in Cascade County, Montana, el. 
 Wickes Tunnel/Boulder Tunnel, abandoned rail tunnel, Great Northern Railway, north of Boulder in Jefferson County, Montana, el.

See also
 Railroads in Montana
 List of tunnels in the United States

Notes

Montana

Tunnels
Tunnels